The Ballade des pendus, literally "ballad of the hanged", also known as Epitaphe Villon or Frères humains, is the best-known poem by François Villon. It is commonly acknowledged, although not clearly established, that Villon wrote it in prison while he awaited his execution. It was published posthumously in 1489 by Antoine Vérard.

Form 

The poem is in the form of a large ballade.
All lines have 10 syllables.
The last line is the same in each stanza.
The first three stanzas have 10 lines, and the last has 5 lines.
Each stanza has the same rhyme scheme.
There are several enjambments.

Text of the ballad with English translation 

The translation deliberately follows the original as closely as possible.

References

External links
   Livres audio mp3 gratuits 'Ballade des pendus' de François Villon -  (Association Audiocité).

1489 works
French poems
Poetry by François Villon